Daan Rots (born 25 July 2001) is a Dutch professional footballer who plays as a winger for Eredivisie club Twente.

Club career
Rots made his professional debut with Twente in a 4–1 Eredivisie win over FC Emmen on 9 January 2021. On 17 February 2021, he signed his first professional contract with Twente for 2+1 years.

Rots became a starter during the 2021–22 season in which the club finished fourth in the league and qualified for the 2022–23 UEFA Europa Conference League. He contributed with three goals in 30 appearances.

References

External links
 Career stats & Profile - Voetbal International

2001 births
Living people
Footballers from Oost Gelre
Dutch footballers
Association football wingers
FC Twente players
Eredivisie players